Bellevue Airport  is located near Leinster in Western Australia, and is not in any way related to the locality in the Perth, Western Australia foothills.

See also
 List of airports in Western Australia
 Aviation transport in Australia

References

External links
 Airservices Aerodromes & Procedure Charts

Airports in Western Australia
Goldfields-Esperance